Éramos Seis ("We Were Six") is a 1943 Brazilian novel by Maria José Dupré about a struggling middle-class family in São Paulo. Praised by writer and critic Monteiro Lobato, it became a best-selling novel and was awarded the Raul Pompeia Prize for best work of 1943 by the Brazilian Academy of Letters. Dupré published a sequel called Dona Lola in 1949.

Éramos Seis has been adapted as a telenovela five times, in 1958, 1967, 1977, 1994 and 2019.

Plot
Éramos Seis chronicles the struggles of a middle-class family in São Paulo through the eyes of its matriarch Dona Lola.

Reception
Éramos Seis was praised by writer and critic Monteiro Lobato and became a best-selling novel. It was awarded the Raul Pompeia Prize for best work of 1943 by the Brazilian Academy of Letters. Darlene Joy Sadlier writes that Lola's "strength, good humor, love, and ingenuity make for a compelling image of the 'ordinary' wife and mother." She notes that the novel's title is poignant because Lola's husband dies halfway through and the family subsequently disintegrates. The popularity of Lola with the Brazilian public prompted Dupré to publish the sequel Dona Lola in 1949.

Adaptations

To date, Éramos Seis has been adapted for television five times. It was first presented as a telenovela by Rede Record in 1958. The novel was next adapted twice by Rede Tupi in 1967 and 1977, and by Sistema Brasileiro de Televisão in 1994. Finally, it was adapted by Rede Globo in 2019.

References

1943 Brazilian novels
Novels set in São Paulo